Kari Lindroos (born 22 March 1962) is a Finnish rower. He competed in the men's coxless pair event at the 1988 Summer Olympics.

References

1962 births
Living people
Finnish male rowers
Olympic rowers of Finland
Rowers at the 1988 Summer Olympics